The Kuranakh-Yuryakh ( or Кураанах-Юрэх; , Kuraanax Ürex) is a river in Sakha Republic (Yakutia), Russia. It is one of the major tributaries of the Omoloy. The lower stretch of its course is also known as Altan.

The Kuranakh-Yuryakh flows north of the Arctic Circle, across desolate tundra territories of the East Siberian Lowland. Its basin falls within Ust-Yansky and Bulunsky districts.

Course
The Kuranakh-Yuryakh is a left tributary of the Omoloy. It has its sources in the eastern slopes of the Orulgan Range of the Verkhoyansk Range system. The river flows roughly northeastwards across mountainous terrain, bound in the east by the Sietinden Range, then it heads eastwards along a wide valley. As it descends into the floodplain of the East Siberian Lowland, it turns again in a northeastern direction, flowing slowly among lakes and dividing into a tangle of river channels. Finally the Kuranakh-Yuryakh joins the left bank of the Omoloy  from its mouth. The nearest inhabited place is Namy, located upstream from its mouth in the Omoloy.

Tributaries
The river is frozen between early October and early June. There are more than thousand lakes in its basin.

See also
Braided river
List of rivers of Russia

References

External links 
Fishing & Tourism in Yakutia

Tributaries of the Omoloy
Rivers of the Sakha Republic
Verkhoyansk Range
East Siberian Lowland
Braided rivers in Russia